is a passenger railway station located in the town of  Higashimiyoshi, Miyoshi District, Tokushima Prefecture, Japan. It is operated by JR Shikoku and has the station number "B20".

Lines
Only local trains stop at the station.

Layout
The station consists of an island platform serving two tracks located on a sidehill cutting. A siding branches off track 1. The station building, located at a lower level than the tracks, is unstaffed and serves only as a waiting room. Outside the station building is the entrance to an underpass with steps which leads to the island platform.

Platforms

Adjacent stations

History
With the privatization of Japanese National Railways (JNR), the successor to JGR, on 1 April 1987, Eguchi came under the control of JR Shikoku. On 1 June 1988, the line was renamed the Tokushima Line.

Surrounding area
Yoshino River
Higashimiyoshi Bridge
Miyoshi City Mino Branch
Rinka-ji Temple (Ohana Daigongen)

See also
 List of Railway Stations in Japan

References

External links

 JR Shikoku timetable

Railway stations in Tokushima Prefecture
Railway stations in Japan opened in 1914
 Higashimiyoshi, Tokushima